In mathematics, given a ring R, the K-theory spectrum of R is an Ω-spectrum  whose nth term is given by, writing  for the suspension of R,
,
where "+" means the Quillen's + construction. By definition, .

References 

Algebraic K-theory